Brugklas: De tijd van m'n leven (The First Years: The time of my life) is a 2019 film directed by Raymond Grimbergen. The film is based on the television series The First Years (Brugklas).

The film won the Golden Film award after having sold 100,000 tickets.

Production 

Principal photography began in October 2018. In December 2018, it was announced that Dennis van der Geest and Natasja Froger were added to the cast. The film is Froger's acting debut; she previously appeared as herself in Gooische Vrouwen.

References

External links 
 

2019 films
2010s Dutch-language films
Films shot in the Netherlands
Dutch comedy-drama films
Films based on television series